Svetislav is a Serbian masculine given name of Slavic origin. It may refer to:

 Svetislav Basara (born 1953), Serbian writer
 Svetislav Glišović (1913–1988), Serbian football player and manager
 Svetislav Goncić (born 1960), Serbian actor
 Svetislav Jovanović (1861–1933), Serbian painter
 Svetislav Mandić (1921–2003), Serbian historian, fresco conserver, poet and painter
 Svetislav Milosavljević (1882–1960), Yugoslav military architect and public officer
 Svetislav Perduv (born 1959), retired football player and manager
 Svetislav Pešić (born 1949), former Serbian professional basketball player and active basketball coach
 Svetislav Stančić (1895–1970), Croatian pianist and music pedagogue
 Svetislav Valjarević (1911–1996), Serbian football player

See also
 Sviatoslav
 Svatoslav (disambiguation)
 Świętosław (disambiguation)
 Svetoslav

Slavic masculine given names
Serbian masculine given names